Julien Lachuer (born 15 November 1976) is a French former professional footballer who played as a goalkeeper.

Personal life
Lachuer is the brother of Yann Lachuer, and the father of Mathis Lachuer, both professional footballers.

References

External links

1976 births
Living people
Sportspeople from Saint-Maur-des-Fossés
French footballers
Association football goalkeepers
Brittany international footballers
Amiens SC players
Angers SCO players
Stade Brestois 29 players
Valenciennes FC players
Ligue 2 players
French people of Breton descent
Footballers from Val-de-Marne